Austrofusus glans is a species of medium-sized sea snail or whelk, a marine gastropod mollusc in the family Buccinidae, the true whelks.

Description
Austrofusus glans is a medium-sized species of buccinid whelk. The species occurs in shallow, subtidal depths down to at least 600 metres on sandy or soft-bottom sediments.

Distribution
The species is endemic to New Zealand.

References

Buccinidae
Gastropods of New Zealand
Gastropods described in 1798
Taxa named by Peter Friedrich Röding